Prince Kiril of Bulgaria, Prince of Preslav (17 November 1895 – 1 February 1945) was the second son of Ferdinand I of Bulgaria and his first wife Marie Louise of Bourbon-Parma. He was a younger brother of Boris III of Bulgaria and a prince regent of the Kingdom of Bulgaria from 1943 to 1944. For the crime of allying Bulgaria with Nazi Gernany, he was executed for war crimes by the Communist Party of Bulgaria after the war ended.

Biography

He was born on 17 November 1895 in Sofia as the second son of Ferdinand I of Bulgaria and his first wife, Marie Louise of Bourbon-Parma.

In September 1936, Prince Kiril accompanied King Edward VIII on a whistle-stop tour of Iceland.
Present at the death of his brother, Tsar Boris, on 28 August 1943, Prince Kiril was appointed head of a regency council by the Bulgarian parliament, to act as Head of State until the late Tsar's son, Simeon II of Bulgaria, became 18.

Prince Kiril, with the widowed Tsaritsa, Giovanna of Savoy, daughter of the Italian king, led the state funeral for his brother Tsar Boris III on 5 September 1943 at the Alexander Nevsky Cathedral, Sofia, thereafter proceeding across the city to the main railway station where the funeral train waited to take the body to the 12th-century Rila Monastery in the mountains. Thereafter the three consecutive governments made efforts to extricate themselves from Bulgaria's agreements with Germany, notably that which permitted their use of the railway to Greece and the German troops stationed along it for protection. A Bulgarian delegation travelled to Cairo in an attempt to negotiate with the United States and the United Kingdom but failed, the latter refusing to meet them without the participation of the Soviet Union.

Despite Sofia's continuous diplomatic ties with the Soviet Union, on 5 September 1944, that country declared war on Bulgaria, and on 8 September Soviet armies crossed the Romanian border and the Danube. The Fatherland Front, a coalition of the Communist Party, the left wing of the Agrarian Union, the Zveno group, and a few pro-Soviet politicians who had returned from exile in the Soviet Union, executed a Soviet-backed military coup on 9 September and seized power.

In late January 1945 Prince Kiril was sentenced to death by the People's Court. On the night of February 1, 1945 he was executed at Sofia Central Cemetery along with former Prime Minister and Regent Professor Bogdan Filov, Regent General Nikola Mihov, and a range of former cabinet ministers, royal advisors and 67 MPs.

On August 26, 1996, the Supreme Court overturned the sentences of February 1, 1945, which sentenced the three regents, ministers, and councilors to death.

Honours and arms

Decorations
 : Knight of Saints Cyril and Methodius
 : Knight of the Black Eagle
 : Knight of St. Hubert
 : Knight of the Annunciation, 1930
 : Grand Cross of the Star of Karađorđe

Arms

Ancestors

References

Literature
 Bulgaria in the Second World War by Marshall Lee Miller, Stanford University Press, 1975.
 Boris III of Bulgaria 1894–1943, by Pashanko Dimitroff, London, 1986, 
 Crown of Thorns by Stephane Groueff, Lanham MD., and London, 1987, 
 The Betrayal of Bulgaria by Gregory Lauder-Frost, Monarchist League Policy Paper, London, 1989.
 The Daily Telegraph, Obituary for "HM Queen Ioanna of the Bulgarians", London, 28 February 2000.

1895 births
1945 deaths
House of Saxe-Coburg and Gotha (Bulgaria)
Princes of Preslav
World War II political leaders
Executed Bulgarian people
Executed royalty
Nobility from Sofia
Regents of Bulgaria
People executed by Bulgaria by firing squad
People's Court (Bulgaria)
Burials at the Rila Monastery
Sons of kings
Non-inheriting heirs presumptive